The 1998 European Road Championships were held in Uppsala, Sweden, in August 1998. Regulated by the European Cycling Union. The event consisted of a road race and time trial for under-23 women and under-23 men.

Events summary

Medal table

References

External links
The European Cycling Union

European Road Championships, 1998
European Road Championships by year
International cycle races hosted by Sweden
1998 in Swedish sport
Sports competitions in Uppsala
August 1998 sports events in Europe